Brazil was the host nation of the 2016 Summer Olympics in Rio de Janeiro from 5 to 21 August 2016. This was the nation's twenty-second appearance at the Summer Olympics, having competed in all editions in the modern era from 1920 onwards, except the 1928 Summer Olympics in Amsterdam. Setting a milestone in Olympic history, Brazil became the first South American country to host the Summer Olympics, and the second Latin American host following the 1968 Summer Olympics in Mexico.

In this edition, Brazil beat both its previous highest number of gold medals obtained at one Olympics until this games (five gold medals in Athens 2004), and its record of total medals won at a Games (17 medals in Beijing 2008 and London 2012). Brazil won gold for the first time in two sports: boxing (Robson Conceição in men's lightweight) and football (men's team).  It was also the first time a Brazilian athlete won three medals at one Games: Isaquias Queiroz in canoeing (two silvers and one bronze). Brazil also won its first ever medals in canoeing sprint, the silver that Queiroz won in C1-1000 m was the first in that sport.

Summary

The shooter Felipe Wu, won the first Brazilian medal in the Rio de Janeiro Games. Wu came very close to taking the top spot on the podium in the men's 10 m air pistol with 202.1 points, but the Vietnamese Hoàng Xuân Vinh hit a brilliant final shot and won the gold medal with an Olympic Record of 202.5 points. The silver medal Felipe Wu won was the first Brazilian medal in Shooting since the Guilherme Paraense at Antwerp 1920 Olympics.

The first Brazilian gold medal was won by the judoka Rafaela Silva in the women's 57 kg . Rafaela Silva beat Wazari the Mongolian Sumiya Dorjsuren, the incumbent leader of the world ranking, in the final. The other 2 medals in judo were bronze.  Mayra Aguiar and Rafael Silva repeated the same results obtained in London / 2012 achieved third places respectively in women's 78 kg and men's +100 kg events.

In gymnastics, three medals were won by Brazil. Diego Hypólito was the silver medalist and Arthur Mariano won the bronze in men's floor. Diego redeemed himself from falls in Beijing and London, when he was a favorite to win a medal, and finally won his first Olympic medal with a note 15.533. Arthur Mariano was the surprise of the competition by earning the bronze with a note 15.433. The gold medal was won by the British Max Whitlock with a note 15.633. In the men's rings, Arthur Zanetti the incumbent gold medalist in London, again made a great presentation in the rings and with a note of 15.766 to win the silver medal; the Greek Eleftherios Petrounias won gold with a note of 16.000.

The swimmer Poliana Okimoto became the first Brazilian woman in history to obtain an Olympic medal in swimming. Originally she finished in fourth place in the Women's 10 km open water, but later was upgraded to the bronze medal with a time of 1:56:51.4 after the disqualification of the French swimmer Aurélie Muller.

In athletics, perhaps the most positively unexpected results happened for the host nation in men's pole vault. The jumper Thiago Braz da Silva won the second gold medal for Brazil in Rio de Janeiro in a thrilling duel with French pole-vaulter Renaud Lavillenie, the world record holder and gold medalist in then current olympic champion. In the final, Lavillenie and Braz were the only two athletes to achieve the high of 5.93m and consequently they were the only two left to dispute the gold medal. Lavillenie managed to clear the next height, 5.98m, easily with his first attempt, but da Silva decided to skip 5.98m and went on to 6.03m. With a successful second attempt at 6.03m, da Silva set a new Olympic Record. Lavillenie, having failed his first two attempts at 6.03m, attempted 6.08 with his final jump but failed, knocking the bar off with his knee. Thiago Braz da Silva won the gold medal with an Olympic record and surpassing his personal best performance in 10 cm, despite never having won a medal in a senior global competition.

In canoeing, the first Olympic medals ever were won by Brazilians in the history of the sport. Isaquias Queiroz was the first Brazilian athlete in history to win three medals (two silver medals and one bronze) at a single Olympic Games, and the first sprint canoe athlete from any nationality to do so in the history of the Olympics. The first silver medal came in the men's C-1 1000 m. After a duel with German Olympic and world champion Sebastian Brendel, Isaquias Queiroz managed to keep up the pace and climbed the podium with the second fastest time (3m58s529). The bronze medal came in  men's C-1 200 m with a time of 39s628. Queiroz's third medal came in  men's C-2 1000 metres, together with Erlon Silva. They stayed in the lead for most of the time of race, but they were surpassed in the final meters by Germans Sebastian Brendel and Jan Vandrey and took the silver medal with a time of 3m44s819.

The third gold medal obtained by the host country was in boxing. Robson Conceição has made history on his home turf by becoming the first Brazilian boxer to take a gold medal. Conceição defeated France's Sofiane Oumiha in the men's lightweight final with a unanimous decision. Conceição's achievement was particularly inspiring given his humble upbringing and after being defeated in his first fights in Beijing and London.

The sailors Martine Grael and Kahena Kunze took the country's fourth gold medal in women's 49erFX. They were the first Brazilian women sailor to win a gold Olympic medal. The competition was tight. The duos representing Brazil, Denmark, and Spain were tied when they reached the final, followed by the New Zealanders one point below. The podium would be defined by their positions on the final race. Martine Grael and Kahena Kunze took the gold, New Zealanders Alex Maloney and Molly Meech the silver, and Denmark's Jena Mai Hansen and Katja Salskov-Iversen the bronze. Martine Grael continued the tradition of her family in sailing at the Olympics: her father Torben Grael is five-time Olympic medalist (twice gold) and her uncle Lars Grael is a twice bronze medalist.

In beach volleyball, Brazilians took two medals. Ágatha Bednarczuk and Bárbara Seixas defeated  in the semifinal the reigning Olympic champion Kerri Walsh Jennings and April Ross, the first defeat of Kerri Walsh after 26 Olympic matches; in the final of the women's beach volleyball tournament, the Brazilians lost to Laura Ludwig and Kira Walkenhorst of Germany by 2 to 0 and took the silver medal in the sands of Copacabana Beach. In the men's beach volleyball tournament, came the fifth gold medal. Alison Cerutti and Bruno Schmidt beat the Italians Paolo Nicolai and Daniele Lupo in straight sets, 21–19, 21–17. While this was the first Olympic medal for Bruno Schmidt, Alison took in London/2012 the silver medal with then-partner Emanuel Rego.

In taekwondo, a bronze medal was won by Maicon Siqueira in men's +80 kg category. He was the first Brazilian man ever to gain an Olympic medal in taekwondo. In a dramatic bronze medal dispute, he beat the British Mahama Cho at the last seconds by 5 to 4 and won the bronze medal.

Finally, in the last two days of the competitions, two gold medals were won in the two most popular sports in Brazil. In the men's football tournament, the gold medal was won by Brazil national under-23 football team, ending a bad sequence of results with three silver medals four years before in London, Seoul 1988 and Los Angeles 1984. In the campaign that began with suspicion after two scoreless draws with South Africa and Iraq, the team easily defeat Denmark, Colombia and Honduras until they reached the gold medal match against Germany. In the final at Maracanã Stadium, there was a 1–1 draw, in which Neymar scored in the normal time. In the penalties shoot-out, after eight flawless kicks, until the goalkeeper Weverton defend the penalty shot by Nils Petersen. Neymar converted the decisive penalty, so the Brazil team won the penalty shoot-out by 5 to 4 and won the gold medal for the first time in Olympic history, in one of the most iconic moments of the 2016 Summer Olympics.

The seventh gold medal and last medal won by the host nation in the 2016 Summer Olympics was in the men's indoor volleyball. Coached by Bernardo Rezende, the Brazil men's national volleyball team had two defeats in the preliminary round, needing a victory against France in the last match to avoid elimination. After that, Brazil defeat Argentina in the quarter-finals and Russia in the semifinals. Brazil reached their fourth consecutive final – the sixth in history – and re-edited the 2004 gold decision against Italy. After two consecutive silver medals, Brazil triumphed the gold medal match by 3 to 0. Among the volleyball players Bruno Rezende, coach Bernardo Rezende's son won his third consecutive Olympic medal and Sérgio Santos became the Brazilian team sports athlete with the most medals, as he participated in every men's indoor final since Athens 2004.

Medalists

|  style="text-align:left; width:78%; vertical-align:top;"|

|  style="text-align:left; width:22%; vertical-align:top;"|

Multiple medallist

The following competitor won several medals at the 2016 Olympic Games.

Competitors

| width=78% align=left valign=top |
The following is the list of number of competitors participating in the games. Note that reserves in fencing, field hockey, football, and handball are not counted:

Archery

Brazil fielded a team of six archers (three men and three women) at the 2016 Olympics, as the host nation is automatically entitled to use these places. The archery team was named to the Olympic roster on 12 July 2016.

Men

Women

Athletics (track and field)

In athletics, the Brazilian team did not receive any automatic places for representing the host nation, as they had done in some other sports. To qualify for the Games, Brazilian athletes must achieve entry standards in the following athletics events (up to a maximum of three athletes in each event): On 16 April 2015, after the release of entry standards from IAAF, the first seven athletes (four in marathon and three in race walk) have officially registered to compete for the Games. The athletics team was named to the final Olympic roster on 3 July 2016. On 13 July, Vanessa Spínola was added to roster after an IAAF decision to complete the quota of participants in the heptathlon.

Track & road events
Men

Women

Field events
Men

Women

Combined events – Men's decathlon

Combined events – Women's heptathlon

Badminton

Brazil fielded a squad of two badminton players (one male and one female) at the 2016 Olympics, as the host nation was automatically entitled to use these places, making the nation's official sporting debut in Olympic history.

Basketball

Men's tournament

Brazil men's national basketball team competed as a host nation in the Olympic Basketball Tournament at the 2016 Rio Games after FIBA's Central Board decided to grant them an automatic place at its meeting in Tokyo on 9 August 2015.

Team roster

Group play

Women's tournament

Brazil women's national basketball team competed as a host nation in the Olympic Basketball Tournament at the 2016 Rio Games after FIBA's Central Board decided to grant them an automatic place at its meeting in Tokyo on 9 August 2015.

Team roster

Group play

Boxing

Brazil has been guaranteed five male boxers at the Games and one female entrant by virtue of being the host nation. At the 2015 World Championships, Robson Conceição had claimed one of the reserved places for the team, allowing its unused "host nation" berth to be redistributed to the rest of the boxers under the Americas continent in the lightweight division. Five other boxers (four men and one woman) were invited by the Brazilian Confederation to use the special "host" vacancies for the Games, while Juan Nogueira and Andreia Bandeira had claimed their Olympic spots on the Brazilian team at the 2016 American Qualification Tournament in Buenos Aires, Argentina.

Men

Women

Canoeing

Slalom
As the host nation, Brazil qualified the maximum of one boat in all four classes. The slalom canoeing team, highlighted by London 2012 Olympian and 2015 Pan American Games silver medalist Ana Sátila, was named to the host nation's roster on 21 June 2016.

Sprint
Being the host nation, Brazil was allocated a place each in the men's K-1 1000 m, and the women's K-1 500 m, but the team earned a healthy number of quota places. Hence, two more boats were added to the team roster through the 2015 ICF Canoe Sprint World Championships, and another set of two through the 2016 Pan American Sprint Qualifier. The sprint canoeing team was named to the Olympic roster on 28 June 2016. On 18 July, the men's K-4 1000 m was added, after the exclusion of boats of Romania and Belarus.

Men

Women

Qualification Legend: FA = Qualify to medal final; FB = Qualify to non-medal final

Cycling

Road
As the host nation, Brazil was entitled to enter four cyclists, two men and two women, in the Olympic road race, in the event that they may have failed to qualify through the 2015 UCI World Tour, and may have finished outside the top 20 individual and top 5 national ranking in the 2015 UCI America Tour. The road cycling team was named to the host nation's Olympic roster on 9 June 2016, with Murilo Fischer riding on the men's road race at his fifth straight Games.

Track
Following the completion of the 2016 UCI Track Cycling World Championships, Brazil entered one rider to compete in the men's omnium at the Olympics, by virtue of his final individual UCI Olympic ranking in that event. This signified the nation's Olympic comeback to the track cycling for the first time since 1992.

Omnium

Mountain biking
As a host nation, Brazil had been awarded a single place each in the men's and women's cross-country race at the Olympics, but the mountain bikers had secured two men's and one women's quota place each, as a result of the nation's thirteenth-place finish each per gender in the UCI Olympic Ranking List of 25 May 2016, giving the unused "host" vacancies to the next highest-ranked eligible nations, not yet qualified. The mountain biking team was announced two days after the list had been released.

BMX
As a host nation, Brazil had been awarded a single place each in the men's and women's BMX race at the Olympics, but the BMX riders had secured one men's and one women's quota place each, as a result of the nation's twelfth-place finish for men in the UCI Olympic Ranking List of 31 May 2016, and top two for women, not yet qualified, at the 2016 UCI BMX World Championships in Medellín, Colombia.

Diving

Brazil, as the host nation, was automatically entitled to places in all synchronized diving events, but athletes for individual events must qualify through their own performances.

Men

Women

Equestrian

Brazil, as the host nation, automatically received a team and a maximum number of four riders in each of the three disciplines: dressage, eventing, and jumping. The Brazilian equestrian team was named to the Olympic roster on 18 July 2016.

Dressage

Eventing

"#" indicates that the score of this rider does not count in the team competition, since only the best three results of a team are counted.

Jumping

"#" indicates that the score of this rider does not count in the team competition, since only the best three results of a team are counted.

Fencing

Brazil was guaranteed eight fencers at the Games by virtue of being the host nation. Following the 2016 FIE World Cup meet in Bonn, Germany, the men's foil team claimed the spot as the highest ranking team from America outside the world's top four in the FIE Official Olympic Rankings. Meanwhile, Renzo Agresta, who has been set to appear at his fourth Olympics (men's sabre), and Nathalie Moellhausen, who previously represented Italy in London 2012 (women's foil), earned more places on the Brazilian team as one of the two highest-ranked individual fencers coming from the America zone in the FIE Adjusted Official Rankings.

Eight other fencers (three each in the men's and women's épée teams and two individuals in women's foil and sabre, respectively), were invited by the Brazilian Confederation to use the special "host" vacancies for the Games, extending the roster size to thirteen.

Men

Women

Field hockey

Summary

Men's tournament

As the host nation, Brazil men's field hockey team qualified for the Olympics by virtue of obtaining a world ranking equal to or better than thirtieth place by the end of 2014, or not finish lower than sixth at the 2015 Pan American Games.

Team roster

Group play

Women's tournament

The Brazil women's national field hockey team did not qualify to the Olympic tournament, as they did not place higher than fortieth in the FIH World Rankings by the end of 2014 nor finished no worse than seventh at the 2015 Pan American Games (they did not even qualify for that tournament). This restriction was decided between the International Hockey Federation (FIH) and the International Olympic Committee (IOC) due to the standard of field hockey in Brazil.

Football

Summary

Men's tournament

The Brazil men's football team automatically qualified for the Olympics as the host nation.

Team roster

Group play

Quarterfinal

Semifinal

Gold medal match

Women's tournament

The Brazil women's football team automatically qualified for the Olympics as the host nation.

Team roster

Group play

Quarterfinal

Semifinal

Bronze medal match

Golf 

Brazil entered three golfers into the Olympic tournament. Adilson da Silva (world no. 271), and Miriam Nagl (world no. 445) qualified directly among the top 60 eligible players for their respective individual events based on the IGF World Rankings as of 11 July 2016. Meanwhile, Victoria Lovelady (world no. 458) received a spare Olympic berth freed up by the Dutch golfers, as the first replacement, to join Nagl in the women's tournament.

Gymnastics

Artistic
Brazil fielded a full squad of five gymnasts in the men's artistic gymnastics events through a top eight finish in the team all-around at the 2015 World Artistic Gymnastics Championships in Glasgow. Meanwhile, the women's team had claimed one of the remaining four spots in the team all-around at the Olympic Test Event in Rio de Janeiro. The artistic gymnastics team was named to the Olympic roster on 8 July 2016.

Men
Team

Individual finals

Women
Team

Individual finals

Rhythmic
Brazil secured six quota places (one individual and a team of five gymnasts) in each of the following events. The rhythmic gymnastics team was named to the Olympic roster on 14 July 2016.

Trampoline
Brazil was guaranteed one quota place as host nation.

Handball

Summary

Men's tournament

The Brazil men's handball team automatically qualified for the Olympics as the host nation.

Team roster

Group play

Quarterfinal

Women's tournament

The Brazil women's handball team automatically qualified for the Olympics as the host nation.

Team roster

Group play

Quarterfinal

Judo

Brazilian judoka secured one place in each of the 14 weight divisions by virtue of hosting the Olympic tournament. The host nation's judo team for the Games was announced on 1 June 2016. Among these judokas featured reigning Olympic champion Sarah Menezes and London 2012 bronze medalists Felipe Kitadai, Rafael Silva, and Mayra Aguiar.

Men

Women

Modern pentathlon

Brazil, as the host nation, received a guaranteed place for each gender, unless a maximum of two men and two women has been selected to the team based on competition results.

Rowing

As the host nation, Brazil was guaranteed a quota place each in the men's and women's single sculls, but the team was expected to earn a substantial number of berths based on its performance at the various qualification events. Brazil secured places in single sculls and lightweight double sculls (men and women) at the Latin American Qualification Regatta in Chile, but they could only choose one boat by gender. Brazilian Rowing Confederation opted to send the men's and women's lightweight double sculls rowers instead to the Games.

Qualification Legend: FA=Final A (medal); FB=Final B (non-medal); FC=Final C (non-medal); FD=Final D (non-medal); FE=Final E (non-medal); FF=Final F (non-medal); SA/B=Semifinals A/B; SC/D=Semifinals C/D; SE/F=Semifinals E/F; QF=Quarterfinals; R=Repechage

Rugby sevens

Men's tournament

The Brazil men's rugby sevens team was automatically qualified for the Olympics as the host nation.

Team roster

Group play

Classification semifinal (9–12)

Eleventh place match

Women's tournament

The Brazil women's rugby team was automatically qualified for the Olympics as the host nation.

Team roster

Group play

Classification semifinal (9–12)

Ninth place match

Sailing

As the host nation, Brazil has guaranteed one boat for each of the following classes at the Rio Olympic regatta, bringing the maximum quota of 15 sailors, in ten boats. On 21 December 2015, the Brazilian Olympic Committee had announced the full squad of sailors for the Rio regatta, including five-time Olympic medalist Robert Scheidt (Laser), skiff siblings Marco and Martine Grael, and 2008 Olympic bronze medalists Fernanda Oliveira (470) and Isabel Swan (Nacra 17).

Men

Women

Mixed

M = Medal race; EL = Eliminated – did not advance into the medal race

Shooting

As the host nation, Brazil has been awarded a minimum of nine quota places in each of the following events. In addition, a shooter that has qualified for one event may compete in others without affecting the quotas, as long as they obtained a minimum qualifying score (MQS) by 31 March 2016.

2010 Youth Olympic pistol champion Felipe Almeida Wu and rifle specialist Cassio Rippel became the only Brazilian shooters to attain a direct nomination to the Olympic team with their gold medal triumphs at the 2015 Pan American Games in Toronto, Canada. Following the end of the qualifying period, Brazilian Confederation had selected six other shooters (Schmits, Carraro, Teixeira, Portela, Duarte, and Ewald) to use the "host" vacancies for the Games. 2008 Olympian Júlio Almeida had occupied an exchanged spot in the women's air pistol with the men's 50 m pistol to round out the Brazilian roster at the completion of the ISSF World Cup meet in Rio de Janeiro.

Men

Women

Qualification Legend: Q = Qualify for the next round; q = Qualify for the bronze medal (shotgun)

Swimming

Brazilian swimmers have so far achieved qualifying standards in the following events (up to a maximum of two swimmers in each event at the Olympic Qualifying Time (OQT), and potentially 1 at the Olympic Selection Time (OST)): Swimmers must compete at the Brazilian Open Tournament and Maria Lenk Trophy (for pool events) to attain the FINA entry standards and confirm their places for the Games.

A total of 32 swimmers (21 men and 11 women), highlighted by London 2012 silver medalist and incoming four-time Olympian Thiago Pereira, had been selected to the Brazilian team for the home Olympics, the largest in history. Notable absence in the roster was 2008 Olympic champion and multiple-time World record holder César Cielo, who missed out on an individual spot in the 50 m freestyle.

Men

Women

* Reserve

Synchronized swimming

As the host nation, Brazil will have a squad of nine synchronized swimmers taking part in both the women's duet and team events.

Table tennis

Brazil fielded a team of six table tennis players (three men and three women) at the 2016 Olympics, as the host nation is automatically entitled to use these places. Hugo Calderano was first selected to the table tennis team by claiming the Olympic spot in the men's singles at the 2015 Pan American Games, while his teammate Gustavo Tsuboi, along with Lin Gui and Caroline Kumahara, both competing in the women's singles, did so at the Latin American Qualification Tournament, allowing their "host" places to be redistributed to the next highest table tennis player in the ITTF Olympic Rankings.

Cazuo Matsumoto and Bruna Takahashi were each awarded the third spot to build the men's and women's teams for the Games as the top Latin American nation in the ITTF Olympic Rankings.

Men

Women

Taekwondo

As the host nation, Brazilian taekwondo players have already received four quota places, two men and two women, at their disposal for the Games. On 18 March 2016, Brazilian Taekwondo nominated the four athletes to take up their host nation places for the Olympics.

Tennis

Brazil has entered seven tennis players (five men and two women) into the Olympic tournament. Two-time Olympian Thomaz Bellucci (world no. 62) qualified directly for the men's singles as one of the top 56 eligible players in the ATP World Rankings as of 6 June 2016. Rogério Dutra Silva and Teliana Pereira had claimed one of six Olympic places each in their respective singles events, as Brazil's top-ranked tennis players outside of direct qualifying position. Meanwhile, Marcelo Melo teamed up with his London 2012 partner Bruno Soares in the men's doubles by virtue of the former's top 10 ATP ranking.

Men

Women

Mixed

Triathlon

Brazil, as the host nation, receives a guaranteed place for each gender, unless a maximum of two men and two women has been selected to the team based on competition results.

Volleyball

Beach
As the host nation, Brazil received a guaranteed place for each gender. Because the host nation has dominated the podium to seal another place each in both the men's and women's tournaments at the 2015 FIVB World Championships, Brazil ensures a maximum of two teams to take part in each competition. On 16 September 2015, the Brazilian Olympic Committee announced the names of the teams in both men's and women's beach volleyball.

Indoor

Men's tournament

The Brazil men's volleyball team was automatically qualified for the Olympics as the host nation.

Team roster

Group play

Quarterfinal

Semifinal

Gold medal match

Women's tournament

The Brazil women's volleyball team was automatically qualified for the Olympics as the host nation.

Team roster

Group play

Quarterfinal

Water polo

Summary

Men's tournament

The Brazil men's water polo team wasw automatically qualified for the Olympics as the host nation.

Team roster

Group play

Quarterfinal

Classification semifinal (5–8)

Seventh place game

Women's tournament

The Brazil women's water polo team was automatically qualified for the Olympics as the host nation.

Team roster

Group play

Quarterfinal

Classification semifinal (5–8)

Seventh place game

Weightlifting

As the hosts, Brazilian weightlifters have already received three men's and two women's quota places for the Rio Olympics. The team must allocate these places to individual athletes by 20 June 2016. The weightlifting team was named to the Olympic roster on 19 June 2016.

Wrestling

Brazilian wrestlers have been offered three guaranteed places at the Games by virtue of the host nation. If any wrestlers qualify directly through the qualification process, these places were to be reduced.

One of them had claimed the Olympic spot in the women's freestyle 75 kg at the 2015 World Championships, while four more places were awarded to the Brazilian wrestlers, who progressed to the top two finals at the 2016 Pan American Qualification Tournament.

Men's Greco-Roman

Women's freestyle

See also
Brazil at the 2015 Pan American Games
Brazil at the 2016 Winter Youth Olympics
Brazil at the 2016 Summer Paralympics

References

External links

 COB: Rio 2016 Brazil's places
 

Nations at the 2016 Summer Olympics
2016
2016 in Brazilian sport